The World Championship Wrestling (WCW) Hall of Fame was an American professional wrestling hall of fame maintained by World Championship Wrestling (WCW). It was established in 1993 to honor wrestlers who began their careers long before the 1990s, mostly alumni of the National Wrestling Alliance (NWA) and Jim Crockett Promotions (JCP), the predecessors of WCW. Inductees received commemorative plaques that had their names & portraits inscribed on them. Wrestlers were inducted by Gordon Solie, a senior commentator in professional wrestling, and received their plaque during the "Legends Reunion" segment at WCW's May pay-per-view event, Slamboree. The WCW Hall of Fame was the second hall of fame established to honor professional wrestlers, after the creation of the World Wrestling Federation (WWF) Hall of Fame in February 1993. After the 1995 Hall of Fame ceremony, WCW stopped the production of the Hall of Fame without a formal announcement. In 2001, the WWF acquired all of its assets; this led to the formal stoppage of the WCW Hall of Fame. The WWF, however, stopped producing its Hall of Fame ceremony after 1996. In 2004, World Wrestling Entertainment (WWE), the WWF's successor, reinstated the WWE Hall of Fame, which included inductees that were alumni of WWE, NWA, JCP, and WCW.

The first Hall of Fame ceremony was held on May 23, 1993, at Slamboree 1993 at The Omni in Atlanta, Georgia. The first wrestler inducted into the Hall of Fame was Lou Thesz, along with Verne Gagne and Mr. Wrestling II. Eddie Graham was also inducted that year; he was the first posthumous inductee into the Hall of Fame. During the following Hall of Fame ceremony on May 22, 1994, at Slamboree 1994 at Civic Center in Philadelphia, Pennsylvania, Harley Race led the Class of 1994. Ole Anderson, The Crusher, posthumous inductee Dick the Bruiser, Ernie Ladd, and Masked Assassin were also inducted that year. The final ceremony was held at Slamboree 1995 on May 25, 1995, in St. Petersburg, Florida at Bayfront Arena, in which Wahoo McDaniel led the Class of 1995. Also inducted that year were posthumous inductee Big John Studd, Terry Funk, Antonio Inoki, Angelo Poffo, Dusty Rhodes, and Gordon Solie.  Following the 1995 ceremony, Solie, who both inducted the wrestlers and was an influential figure in the selections, resigned from WCW in protest of Poffo's initiation, feeling that management only inducted an unqualified person into the WCW Hall of Fame as a favor to Poffo's son, and one of the company's top draws, Randy Savage. 1995's ceremony had speeches from the inductons, where as the other two just had plaques being presented to them. The Crusher, Dick the Bruiser, Inoki, Rhodes, Gagne, Race, and Thesz were the only former World Heavyweight Champions to have been inducted. A posthumous inductee was inducted at every ceremony. Solie was the only non-wrestler to have been inducted into the Hall of Fame. Overall, there were 17 inductees.

Inductees

See also
List of professional wrestling halls of fame

Notes 
 – From 1996 to 2001, WCW did not induct any person into the Hall of Fame.
 – Entries without a birth name indicates that the inductee did not perform under a ring name.
 – Before the 1990s, Jim Crockett Promotions (JCP) consisted of the American Wrestling Association (AWA) and the World Wrestling Association (WWA), while the National Wrestling Alliance (NWA) distributed many of its titles among its member promotions; these included the World (Wide) Wrestling Federation [W(W)WF], Extreme Championship Wrestling, and Championship Wrestling From Florida, among others.
 – This section mainly lists the major accomplishments of each inductee in the NWA, JCP, and WCW.

References

Citations

General references

External links 
 The other Hall of Fame: WCW's forgotten honor at WWE.com
 WCW Hall of Fame at Steelcagematch.com

1993 establishments in Georgia (U.S. state)
Awards disestablished in 1996
Awards established in 1993
Professional wrestling-related lists
Hall of Fame
Halls of fame in Georgia (U.S. state)
Professional wrestling halls of fame